Open Financial Exchange (OFX) is a data-stream format for exchanging financial information that evolved from Microsoft's Open Financial Connectivity (OFC) and Intuit's Open Exchange file formats.

History
Microsoft, Intuit and CheckFree announced the OFX standard on 16 January 1997. The first OFX specification, version 1.0, was released on 14 February 1997. The specification allows for bank- and application-specific extensions, although only a subset is necessary to describe a financial transaction.

Versions 1.0 through 1.6 relied on SGML for data exchange, but later versions are XML based. According to the main OFX site, "The specification is freely licensed, allowing any software developer to design an interface that will be supported on the front-end."

Support in various countries
Many banks in the US let customers use personal financial management software to automatically download their bank statements in OFX format, but most Canadian, United Kingdom and Australian banks do not allow this, however, many banks do support downloading financial data in OFX, QFX, QIF, or spreadsheet format via their web interface for later import into financial software.

Intuit and QFX
QFX is a proprietary variant of OFX used in Intuit's products. In Intuit products, OFX is used for Direct Connect and QFX for Web Connect. Direct Connect allows personal financial management software to connect directly to a bank OFX server, whereas in Web Connect, the user needs to log in and manually download a .qfx file and import it into Quicken.

See also
 ISO 20022
 FinTS (formerly HBCI)

References

External links
 More information on the OFX specification
 OFX Press Release (copy)
 List of OFX connection details for banks that support OFX
 OFX forums, list of verified OFX connection details
 OFX file viewer

Computer file formats
Computer-related introductions in 1997
Financial software